Waide is a variant of the English surname Wade.

Notable people sharing this surname include:
 Eoin Waide (21st century) of Ireland
 Scott Waide (born 1977) of New Zealand
 Ben Waide (born 1963) of the United States

References 

Surnames of English origin